Jobst Kuch (26 October 1902 – 23 May 1963) was a German painter. His work was part of the painting event in the art competition at the 1936 Summer Olympics.

References

1902 births
1963 deaths
20th-century German painters
20th-century German male artists
German male painters
Olympic competitors in art competitions
Artists from Nuremberg